Nebria torosa is a species of ground beetle in the Nebriinae subfamily that can be found in Qinghai province of China.

References

torosa
Beetles described in 1994
Beetles of Asia
Endemic fauna of China